Dmitry Kuznetsov (born 5 March 1975, Moscow) is a Russian political figure and a deputy of the 8th State Duma.

In 1997, Kuznetsov graduated from Moscow State University. From 1997 to 2015, he was engaged in marketing and worked as a producer in showbusiness. He also worked at the Media Star company founded by Yuri Aizenshpis. In June 2019, he joined the All-Russia People's Front. In 2020, Kuznetsov was appointed secretary of the central committee of the For Truth party initiated by writer Zakhar Prilepin. In 2021, the party was merged with the parties A Just Russia and Patriots of Russia. Since October 2021, he has served as deputy of the 8th State Duma.

After 2022 Russian invasion of Ukraine, Kuznetsov declared the party's plans to open branches in Kherson and Lugansk. In his interview, he also mentioned that Russia needs to be "self-cleaned".

References
 

 

1975 births
Living people
A Just Russia politicians
21st-century Russian politicians
Eighth convocation members of the State Duma (Russian Federation)
Politicians from Moscow
Moscow State University alumni